John Abel (died 1675) was an English carpenter and mason.

John Abel may also refer to:

John Abel (politician) (1939–2019)
John Abel (minister)  (1770–1819), Welsh minister
John Jacob Abel (1857–1938), American pharmacologist
Johnny Abel (1947–1995), Canadian politician

See also

John Abell (1653–?), Scottish musician
John Abele (born 1937), American businessman
Jack Abel (1927–1996), cartoonist